The Socimi coaches of the Ferrovie Nord Milano, also known as type hinterland, are a class of railway coaches for commuter trains, built in the 1980s by Socimi.

The coaches have been used together with E.620 locomotives or E.750 railcars. At this moment they are going to be scrapped, substituted by the double-deck railcars E.760 and E.710.

References 
 

Socimi
Train-related introductions in 1981